Anja Krüger (married Schneider, born 20 March 1964) is a German handball player. She participated at the 1992 Summer Olympics, where the German national team placed fourth.
At the World Cup in 1990 in South Korea, she won the bronze medal and was chosen in the allstar-team of this world cup.
With her home club Leipzig she won the European cup two times (1986, 1992)

References 
 Profile at sports-reference.com

1964 births
Living people
Handball players from Berlin
German female handball players
Olympic handball players of Germany
Handball players at the 1992 Summer Olympics